This is a list of noteworthy anime conventions from around the world, as distinct from comic book conventions, furry conventions, gaming conventions, horror conventions, multigenre conventions, and science fiction conventions. This list is sectioned by location, and included with the list is the year the convention was established, as well as the months or dates which the convention are typically held within. Multi-genre, comic book, furry, gaming, and science fiction conventions are not listed here.

Note: Almost all of the conventions listed were affected by the COVID-19 pandemic, and may have skipped events in one or more years during 2020–2022.

North America

South America

Asia-Pacific

Europe

Defunct and on-hiatus conventions
These are notable conventions that have at one time existed, but have either gone on hiatus for more than one year, were merged into other conventions, or have finished operating entirely. The category conventions fall under are determined by the amount of communication given by convention officials. Anime conventions disrupted by the COVID-19 pandemic are not listed here unless they became defunct. 

On Hiatus - Any convention that has had an official announcement of hiatus of 3 years or less.
Inactive - Any convention that has been on Hiatus for more than 3 years, but has a working website.
Defunct - An official or reliable announcement is made saying that the convention has ceased operations. If there is no communication then another criterion can be considered, such as an official website appearing to be dead (HTTP 404 errors) or the website has been changed to another individual with no relation.
Merged - An official announcement of a merger between two conventions has been made.

See also
List of comic book conventions
List of gaming conventions
List of multigenre conventions
List of science fiction conventions
List of Worldcons
List of Worldcons by city

Notes

External links
AnimeCons.com
UpcomingCons.com

 
Anime and manga lists
Anime and manga fandom
Lists by country